Lin Chih-hsiang (born 8 March 1987) is a former Taiwanese baseball second baseman who had played with the Uni-President 7-Eleven Lions in the Chinese Professional Baseball League (CPBL). He was drafted by the Lions in 2009 and won the CPBL's Gold Glove Award from 2014 to 2016.

Lin represented Taiwan at the 2006 World University Baseball Championship,  2008 World University Baseball Championship, 2008 Haarlem Baseball Week, 2009 World Port Tournament, 2009 Asian Baseball Championship, 2009 Italian Baseball Week, 2009 Baseball World Cup, 2012 Asian Baseball Championship and 2017 World Baseball Classic.

References

1987 births
Living people
Baseball second basemen
People from Taitung County
Uni-President Lions players
Uni-President 7-Eleven Lions players
Taiwanese baseball players
2017 World Baseball Classic players